The Rembrandt Award was a Dutch film award. Initially created in 1993, it was not awarded between 1999 and 2006, but was recreated in 2007 by René Mioch..  
It has not been awarded since 2015.

2007 
Zwartboek – Best Dutch Film
Daniël Boissevain for Wild Romance – Best Dutch Actor
Carice van Houten for Zwartboek – Best Dutch Actress
Pirates of the Caribbean: Dead Man's Chest Special Edition – Best DVD Release
Pirates of the Caribbean: Dead Man's Chest – Best Foreign Film
Johnny Depp for Pirates of the Caribbean: Dead Man's Chest – Best Foreign Actor
Meryl Streep for The Devil Wears Prada – Best Foreign Actress
Henny Vrienten – Honorary Rembrandt Award for his film compositions

2008 
Alles is Liefde – Best Dutch Film
Thomas Acda for Alles is Liefde – Best Dutch Actor
Carice van Houten for Alles is Liefde – Best Dutch Actress
Zwartboek – Best DVD Release
Pirates of the Caribbean: At World's End – Best Foreign Film
Johnny Depp for Pirates of the Caribbean: At World's End – Best Foreign Actor
Keira Knightley for Pirates of the Caribbean: At World's End and Atonement – Best Foreign Actress
Pierre Bokma and Goldie Hawn – Honorary Rembrandt Awards

2009 
Oorlogswinter – Best Dutch Film
Martijn Lakemeier for Oorlogswinter – Best Dutch Actor
Melody Klaver for Oorlogswinter – Best Dutch Actress
Alles is Liefde – Best DVD Release
Ilse DeLange with Miracle from the movie Bride Flight – Best Film Song
Mamma Mia! – Best Foreign film
Heath Ledger for The Dark Knight – Best Foreign Actor
Meryl Streep for Mamma Mia! – Best Foreign Actress
Willeke van Ammelrooy – Honorary Rembrandt Award

2010 
Komt een vrouw bij de dokter – Best Dutch Film
Barry Atsma for Komt een vrouw bij de dokter – Best Dutch Actor
Carice van Houten for Komt een vrouw bij de dokter – Best Dutch Actress
Harry Potter and the Half-Blood Prince – Best DVD/Blu-ray Release
Kane with Love Over Healing from the movie Komt een vrouw bij de dokter – Best Film Song
Avatar – Best Foreign Film
Brad Pitt for The Curious Case of Benjamin Button – Best Foreign Actor
Sandra Bullock for The Proposal – Best Foreign Actress
Jany Temime – Honorary Rembrandt Award for her work as costume designer

2011 
New Kids Turbo – Best Dutch Film
Jeroen van Koningsbrugge for Loft – Best Dutch Actor
Carice van Houten for De Gelukkige Huisvrouw – Best Dutch Actress
Avatar – Best DVD/Blu-ray Release
DJ Paul Elstak and the New Kids with Turbo – Best Film Song
Inception – Best Foreign Film
Johnny Depp for Alice in Wonderland (2010) – Best Foreign Actor
Angelina Jolie for Salt – Best Foreign Actress
Rene Mioch and Renée Soutendijk – Honorary Rembrandt for a professional career of 25 years and Honorary Rembrandt for film career

2012 
Gooische Vrouwen – Best Dutch Film
Rutger Hauer for De Heineken Ontvoering – Best Dutch Actor
Carice van Houten for Black Butterflies – Best Dutch Actress
Corry Konings with Hoeren neuken nooit meer werken from the film New Kids Nitro – Best Film Song
Razend – Best Dutch Youth Film
Harry Potter and the Deathly Hallows – Part 2 – Best Foreign Film
Colin Firth for The King's Speech – Best Foreign Actor
Natalie Portman for Black Swan – Best Foreign Actress
Hans Kemna – Honorary Rembrandt for his contribution to the Dutch Film Industry

2013 
Alles Is Familie – Best Dutch Film
Thijs Römer for Alles Is Familie – Best Dutch Actor
Carice van Houten for Alles Is Familie – Best Dutch Actress
Racoon with Oceaan from the film Alles Is Familie – Best Film Song
Achtste Groepers Huilen Niet – Best Dutch Youth Film
Intouchables – Best Foreign Film
Daniel Craig for Skyfall – Best Foreign Actor
Meryl Streep for The Iron Lady – Best Foreign Actress

2014 
Leonardo DiCaprio for The Great Gatsby – Best Foreign Actor
Jennifer Lawrence for The Hunger Games: Catching Fire – Best Foreign Actress

2015 
Gooische Vrouwen 2 – Best Dutch Film
Tygo Gernandt for Bloedlink – Best Dutch Actor
Linda de Mol voor Gooische Vrouwen 2 – Best Dutch Actress
Mr Probz with Nothing Really Matters from the film Gooische Vrouwen 2 – Best Film Song
Oorlogsgeheimen – Best Dutch Youth Film
12 Years a Slave – Best Foreign Film
Leonardo DiCaprio for The Wolf of Wall Street – Best Foreign Actor
Angelina Jolie voor Maleficent – Best Foreign Actress
Gijs Scholten van Aschat – Honorary Rembrandt Award

References

Dutch film awards